Also a place near Gwalior, Madhya Pradesh

Govindpur is one of the oldest colonies established by Allahabad Development Authority in 1981 at the bank of the river Ganges.

Geography
The approximate area of the colony is 1.5 km2. It is situated on a plateau which protects it from the frequent floods of the river Ganges. It has four levels of residential structures, EWS (economically weaker section), LIG (lower income group), MIG (middle income group) and HIG (higher income group)—representing a typical socio-economic class structure in India. It also comprises plots which gives it a more elegant look.

Transportation
It is very well connected by local transport with the rest of the city with indigenous developed vehicles called Vikram. It is also supported by private and government bus services called Mahanagri and UPSRTC.

Facilities
The oldest shop is that of Moti Yadav  who sells sweets, samosas and tea. The main markets are Aashiyana market, Jeeshan market.  There are two Durga Puja Parks here. Popular shops include Bikaner sweets and Real Cake Palace. The prime shopping place in Govindpur is at Zeeshan market where various kinds of shops ranging from general store to gift shops can be found.

Nearby localities are Chandpur, Salori, Bhulai Ka Purwa, Shivpuri and Shivkuti. 

The best part of the place is near and around taxi stand which houses HIGs from H1 to H10 and a lot many LIG flats. Lalaji Supermart, Shanti Niketan, Chettinad Foods and Education World Coaching are some of the attractions of the area. There is Uptron Chowraha near Govindpur which is a local get together place for youngsters. 

There are a number of medical stores in Govindpur; one can be found at Zeeshan Market and another important medical shop is Jaiswal Medical Store at Govindpur Chauraha. A number of roadside shops serve fast foods.

Nearby places

Places to visit in Govindpur include Shivkuti Temple, one of the oldest temples of India which houses a Shiv Kaccheri which has thousands of shivlings and is of high importance to Shiv devotees. The Narayan Ashram is another such place which houses three temples in inside a huge lush green campus, which is a great outing spot for local residents. Also the famous, Motilal Nehru National Institute of Technology, one of the 30 NIT's of India is situated just one and a half kilometres from Govindpur colony. There are a number of restaurants too situated quite close to Govindpur area important one being, Treat Restaurant and The Home Restaurant.

About 14.2 km from sangam "In Hindu tradition Triveni Sangam is the 'confluence' of three rivers. Sangama is the Sanskrit word for confluence. The point of confluence is a sacred place for Hindus".

Neighbourhoods in Allahabad